The 2017 European Women Basketball Championship, commonly called EuroBasket Women 2017, was the 36th edition of the continental tournament in women's basketball, sanctioned by the FIBA Europe. The tournament was awarded to Czech Republic after winning the bid to Serbia. The tournament also serves as a qualification for the 2018 FIBA Women's Basketball World Cup in Spain, with the top five nations qualifying. As hosts Spain finished in the top five, the sixth placed team also qualified.

The championship was reverted to a 16 teams championship, after the 20 teams that participated in 2015.

Spain defeated France 71–55 in the final to win their third title.

In total, 61 556 people visited this event.

Venues

Qualification

Qualified teams

Draw
The draw took place in Prague on 9 December 2016.

Seedings

Squads

All rosters consisted of 12 players.

First round

Group A

Group B

Group C

Group D

Final round

Final

Final ranking

Statistics and awards

Statistical leaders

Points

Rebounds

Assists

Blocks

Steals

Awards

References

External links

Official website

 
2017
2016–17 in European women's basketball
International women's basketball competitions hosted by the Czech Republic
2017 in Czech women's sport
June 2017 sports events in Europe
2016–17 in Czech basketball